A pulley is a device used to transfer mechanical energy.

Pulley may also refer to:
 Pulley (band)
 Pulley, Shropshire, village in England
 Gerald P. Pulley (1922–2011), American photographer
 Sheila Maid, an overhead clothes rack, called a 'pulley' in Scotland

See also
Puli, a breed of Hungarian herding and livestock guarding dog